Jason Bryan Mooney (born 26 February 1989) is a Northern Irish semi-professional footballer who plays as a goalkeeper.

Career
Born in Newtownards, County Down, Mooney worked various jobs including as a gardener, at a car wash and at a farm while playing in Northern Ireland. He started his football career with Ards's youth system, with whom he won the Youth League Cup in April 2008. His debut for the first team came before that, as he started a 2–1 away defeat to Carrick Rangers in the Irish First Division on 29 December 2007. Mooney made three appearances for Ards in the 2007–08 season, before signing for newly promoted IFA Premiership club Bangor in the summer of 2008. He had a spell with Ards Rangers before joining Comber Recreation (both of the Northern Amateur Football League) over the summer of 2009.

Mooney took part in a goalkeeping course in the south of England during the summer of 2011, which was attended by scouts from across England. He signed a one-year contract with English League One club Wycombe Wanderers in August 2011 after impressing during a two-month trial. He had earlier signed non-contract terms after working for the club as a barman. Mooney spent the 2011–12 season on loan at Southern League Premier Division club Oxford City, and helped the club to win promotion into the Conference North with a 4–2 play-off final victory over AFC Totton. He made 45 appearances for City, but was released by Wycombe in May 2012 following their relegation into League Two.

Mooney had trials with Conference Premier club Cambridge United and League One club Tranmere Rovers before joining the latter on a one-year contract in July 2012 as back-up for Owain Fôn Williams. He made his debut on 27 April 2013, in a 0–0 home draw with Bournemouth – his clean sheet helped to deny the visitors the League One title on the last day of 2012–13. Mooney signed a new one-year contract in June 2013 and manager Ronnie Moore commented that "Jason has really progressed and I'm pleased he will be staying with us". He made three appearances in 2013–14, which culminated in Tranmere's relegation to League Two.

Mooney turned down a new contract with Tranmere to sign for League Two club York City on 29 May 2014 on a two-year contract. He made his debut in York's 1–1 away draw with his former club Tranmere in the opening match of 2014–15 on 9 August 2014. Having made only five appearances for York, he joined Conference Premier club Alfreton Town for the rest of the season on 17 January 2015. Mooney made 13 appearances for Alfreton before being recalled by York on 3 April 2015 after Bobby Olejnik was suspended.

Mooney was released by York by mutual consent ahead of a transfer to their League Two rivals Accrington Stanley on 1 July 2015 on a one-year contract.

Career statistics

Honours
Oxford City
Southern League Premier Division play-offs: 2011–12

References

External links

1989 births
Living people
People from Newtownards
Sportspeople from County Down
Association footballers from Northern Ireland
Association football goalkeepers
Ards F.C. players
Bangor F.C. players
Wycombe Wanderers F.C. players
Oxford City F.C. players
Tranmere Rovers F.C. players
York City F.C. players
Alfreton Town F.C. players
Accrington Stanley F.C. players
Cliftonville F.C. players
Southern Football League players
English Football League players
National League (English football) players
NIFL Premiership players